KLTR 94.1 FM is a radio station broadcasting an adult contemporary format. The station is currently licensed to Brenham, Texas, with a construction permit in place to move the facility farther north and upgrade the facility to 50 kilowatts with an elevation decrease to 90 meters. This will upgrade 94.1 from its current C3 license to a C2, and will also shift its COL to Hempstead, Texas, covering the majority of the Bryan/College Station area, as well as the northwest suburbs of Houston. The station is owned by Roy E. Henderson, d.b.a. Fort Bend Broadcasting. KLTR, then KULF, began broadcasting on March 16, 1989. It was founded by May Broadcasting.

The station's studios and transmitter are located separately in Brenham.

References

External links
KLTR's official website

Mainstream adult contemporary radio stations in the United States
LTR
1988 establishments in Texas